The Peugeot Type 2 is the first petrol/gasoline-powered motor vehicle produced between 1890 and 1891 by the French auto-maker Peugeot at their Valentigney plant. The car was presented just two years after Armand Peugeot had split away from the Peugeot family business in order to concentrate on cars, with a separate Peugeot Automobiles business.

History 
In 1889 Peugeot attended that year's Paris Universal Exhibition, where he was demonstrating four of his Peugeot Type 1 prototypes, which were powered by steam engines (from Léon Serpollet). The Type 1 received a tepid reception, and Peugeot was already aware of the limitations arising from the vibration profile and sheer weight of a steam engine in this type of car-sized powered vehicle.

The visit to the exhibition was not wasted, however, as he also came across the revolutionary invention of Gottlieb Daimler, a reciprocating combustion engine powered by petrol/gasoline. As soon as the exhibition was over Daimler arranged for his engine to be assembled in France by Panhard et Levassor of Paris and came to an agreement with Peugeot for its use in a new quadricycle.   Peugeot was also able to negotiate with the widow of Edouard Sarazin. Sarazin's acquisition, before he died, of the rights to manufacture the Daimler combustion engine in France, made his widow, Louise, a key figure in the early life of the motor industry in France, which would be the world's top auto producing nation till out-produced by the United States in 1906.

Approximately a year after Armand Peugeot's eventful visit to Paris, the Peugeot Type 2 appeared, to be followed by the Type 3, which events together marked the inauguration of the Peugeot automobile business.

Performance 
The Peugeot Type 2 was powered by a two-cylinder four stroke V-format petrol/gasoline engine, assembled under licence from Daimler. The engine was mounted underneath the seat, above and slightly ahead of the rear axle to which it was linked by a chain-drive.  of power was provided from the  unit. Cooling being then as now a challenge in a combustion engine, the Type 2's engine incorporated tubes filled with water, adumbrating the radiator that would be an essential feature of many combustion engines in the ensuing centuries.

A rudimentary suspension system pointed the way ahead regarding what would become another mainstream feature of the motor car.

The main Peugeot business was, at this time, expanding rapidly its bicycle production, and the Type 2’s light weight may have incorporated lessons learned from cycle production. Four Type 2s were produced. Three were quadricycles while the fourth was a tricycle. They all had space for two on the bench above the engine.

Notes

Further reading 
 Wolfgang Schmarbeck: Alle Peugeot Automobile 1890–1990. Motorbuch-Verlag. Stuttgart 1990. .

External links 
 Picture

1890s cars
Type 2
Vehicles introduced in 1890
Rear-engined vehicles